The Maryland State Bar Association (MSBA) is a voluntary bar association for the state of Maryland. 

The association pursues the following mission: "to effectively represent Maryland’s lawyers, to provide member services, and to promote professionalism, diversity in the legal profession, access to justice, service to the public and respect for the rule of law."

The MSBA does not handle matters such as law licensing or complaints against lawyers; those powers rest with the Maryland Judiciary.

The MSBA publishes the quarterly Maryland Bar Journal, the monthly Maryland Bar Bulletin, the weekly Maryland Law Digest court opinions and MSBA Weekly news, frequent MSBA News blog posts, the Maryland Lawyer's Manual legal directory, and an annual report.

The organization was established on August 8, 1896, and is directed by a 43-member Board of elected Governors, including 32 elected by geographical districts, four "Young Lawyer" governors, and the organization's officers.

It was the last state bar association in the United States to restrict membership to men, which led to the formation of the Women's Bar Association of Maryland in 1929. Rose Zetzer became the first female MSBA member in 1946. 

In 1985, the Poe School, located at the northeast corner of Baltimore's West Fayette and North Greene Streets, became the permanent home of the Maryland State Bar Association.

References

American state bar associations
1896 establishments in Maryland
Organizations based in Baltimore
Organizations established in 1896
501(c)(6) nonprofit organizations